SS W. P. Few was a Liberty ship built in the United States during World War II. She was named after Alexander S. Clay, a member of the Georgia House of Representatives and United States Senator from Georgia.

Construction
Alexander S. Clay was laid down on 3 May 1944, under a Maritime Commission (MARCOM) contract, MC hull 2364, by J.A. Jones Construction, Brunswick, Georgia; she was sponsored by Miss Vaida V. Clay, and launched on 30 June 1944.

History
She was allocated to the South Atlantic Steamship Lines Inc., on 15 July 1944. On 22 September 1948, she was laid up in the National Defense Reserve Fleet in Mobile, Alabama. On 29 August 1969, she was sold, to Southern Scrap Material, Co., Inc., for scrapping. She was removed from the fleet on 26 September 1969.

References

Bibliography

 
 
 
 
 

 

Liberty ships
Ships built in Brunswick, Georgia
1944 ships
Mobile Reserve Fleet